Since 16' (stylized in all caps) is the debut studio album of South Korean rapper Since. It was released through Boiling Point Project on July 16, 2021. It later peaked at number 57 on the Circle Album Chart.

Background 
In an interview with Marie Claire Korea, Since explained how the album was produced.
Deepflow was a special guest at the concert I participated in last year, and after watching my performance, he said he enjoyed it. I showed him my work right away and I was offered the Boiling Point Project. That's how the album was born.

Music and lyrics 
In Since 16''', Since shares her thoughts and experiences about music after she started rapping in 2016. In "Hol' Up", "Cop", "Honest", "Fist Down", and "Boarding", she shows her confidence and aspiration through speedy and rough rapping, which is her strength. In the latter half of the album, she experiments with melodic raps that are more sentimental and delicate than those of the first half. In "Spring Rain", she uses the symbolism of spring rain that represents both reality and success.

 Critical reception 
Hwang Duha of Rhythmer'' rated the album 3.5 out of 5 stars. According to him, "the fact that Since is a female rapper can act as a bias - which can be either good or bad. However, it is very impressive that she does not seem to care about that." He also described the album as a "successful self-introduction of a rookie rapper who has just begun to spread her wings."

Year-end lists

Track listing

Charts

Notes

References 

2021 debut albums
Hip hop albums by South Korean artists